Rose of the Tenements is a 1926 American silent melodrama film, directed by Phil Rosen. It stars Shirley Mason, John Harron, and Evelyn Selbie, and was released on May 26, 1926.

Cast list
 Shirley Mason as Rosie Rossetti
 John Harron as Danny Lewis
 Evelyn Selbie as Sara Kaminsky
 Sidney Franklin as Abraham Kaminsky
 James Gordon as Tim Galligan
 Frank McGlynn Jr. as Mickey Galligan
 Scott McKee as Paddy Flynn
 Jesse De Vorska as Izzie Kohn
 Mathilde Comont as Mrs. Kohn
 Valentina Zimina as Emma Goldstein

References

External links 
 
 
 

Films directed by Phil Rosen
Melodrama films
American silent feature films
1926 films
1920s English-language films
Film Booking Offices of America films
Silent American drama films
1926 drama films
American black-and-white films
1920s American films